Renato Gei (1 February 1921 – 20 May 1999) was an Italian association football manager and footballer who played as a forward. On 25 November 1951, he represented the Italy national football team on the occasion of a friendly match against Switzerland in a 1–1 away draw.

References

1921 births
1999 deaths
Italian footballers
Italy international footballers
Association football forwards
Serie A players
Serie B players
Serie C players
Brescia Calcio players
Torino F.C. players
ACF Fiorentina players
U.C. Sampdoria players
Spezia Calcio players
F.C. Pavia players
Serie B managers
Genoa C.F.C. managers
Brescia Calcio managers
S.S. Lazio managers
Atalanta B.C. managers
Parma Calcio 1913 managers
Italian football managers
Footballers from Brescia